I Live for Love is a 1935 American musical comedy film directed by Busby Berkeley and starring Dolores del Río, Everett Marshall and Guy Kibbee.

The film's sets were designed by the art director Esdras Hartley.

Plot summary
Donna Del Rio is a diva of the stage and her wish is for her lover, Rico Alvarado, to be her leading man. To prevent this from happening, the producers pick Roger Kerry from the streets and give him a job.

Main cast
 Dolores del Río as Donna  
 Everett Marshall as Roger Kerry  
 Guy Kibbee as Henderson  
 Allen Jenkins as Mac  
 Berton Churchill as Fabian  
 Hobart Cavanaugh as Townsend  
 Eddie Conrad as Street Musician  
 Al Shaw as Street Musician  
 Sam Lee as Street Musician
 Don Alvarado as Rico Cesaro  
 Mary Treen as Clementine - Donna's Maid  
 Robert Greig as Fat Man Dancing at Nightclub

References

Bibliography
 Mary Beltrán. Latina Stars in U.S. Eyes. University of Illinois Press, 2009.

External links
 
 
 
 
 

1935 films
1935 musical comedy films
American musical comedy films
Films directed by Busby Berkeley
Films scored by Heinz Roemheld
Warner Bros. films
American black-and-white films
1930s English-language films
1930s American films